Newley is a surname, and it may refer to the following people:

Anthony Newley (1931–1999), English actor, singer and songwriter
Brad Newley (born 1985), Australian basketball player, brother of Mia
Mia Newley (born 1988), Australian basketball player, sister of Brad
Tara Newley (born 1963), English singer

Surnames